Rémi Benoît (January 3, 1842 – June 19, 1919) was a man of a number of vocations from D'Escousse, Nova Scotia.

Benoît, at various times, was a teacher, an office holder, a newspaper editor. He was a French-speaking Acadian who received a great deal of his education in English, resulting in his being fluently bi-lingual. He is important to Canadian history because of his support of the Acadian nationalist cause. This support was most evident in his work involving a mutual benefit society. In 1881 he helped organize the Convention Nationale des Acadiens and also on three subsequent occasions. This culminated in 1902 with the formation of the Société l'Assomption, a mutual benefit society. This became the most important Acadian financial institution of the 20th century and Benoît served as president, chancellor, and a director.

Benoît devoted much energy to Acadian causes and founding an institution that, in an altered form, still exists today.

External links 
 Biography at the Dictionary of Canadian Biography Online

Acadian people
1842 births
1919 deaths